Upper Holmesburg is a neighborhood in Northeast Philadelphia.  It is located along the Delaware River and Pennypack Creek, from Frankford Avenue to Willits Road.
St. Dominic Roman Catholic parish is located in this section on the 8500 block of Frankford Avenue.

References

Neighborhoods in Philadelphia
Northeast Philadelphia